The NS Class 186 is a type of B-B electric locomotive built by Bombardier Transportation between 2006 and 2014. It is a member of the Bombardier TRAXX family of locomotives, the Bombardier TRAXX F140 MS2 variant.

The locomotives are used for pulling passenger stock, formerly for NS Hispeed and now for NS International.  They are a Multi-Systems variant of the TRAXX, a quadruple voltage locomotive, able to operate on most European electrification schemes: 1.5/3.0 kV DC and 15/25 kV AC.

The Class is formed of two batches, the first introduced in 2008 are leased locomotives. The second batch were introduced in 2014 and are owned by NS.

History

HSA batch
The locomotives are built in Kassel, Germany. The first 12 locomotives were ordered from Alpha Trains by High Speed Alliance (HSA) in 2005. These arrived in 2008 and 2009 to operate services on the HSL-Zuid between Amsterdam and Breda. These trains have a maximum speed of 160 km/h. These locomotives were intended to be a temporary measure until the V250 high-speed sets entered service. The V250 entered service in 2012, but was taken out of service in early 2013 and these have since been sold back to the manufacturer. For this reason the NS TRAXX locomotives are still in service and will remain so until at least 2020.

The leased locomotives were delivered in a red livery with white fronts, but since 2015 are being repainted yellow-blue.

NS batch
On 18 December 2013 NS announced that 19 locomotives had been ordered in addition to the 12 leased TRAXX locomotives in service. These were delivered between August 2014 and January 2015. This batch are owned by NS and are in the company's yellow-blue livery.

On 17 June 2015 NS announced that a new batch of 26 locomotives had been ordered. The delivery started on 23 May 2016. The new locomotives will help the NS to drive each high-speed train in a so-called 'sandwich-formation' (locomotive + coaches + locomotive). Delivery was completed on 27 November 2016.

Sale to Akiem

Since NS plans to replace the push-pulls sets with high speed multiple units in the near future, the old coaching stock will be withdrawn while these comparatively new locomotives will be useless. In 2018, NS took a sale-and-leaseback agreement with Akiem for the entire Class 186 engines they own. NS will lease these engines to Akiem until the ICNG trainsets are delivered. The Class 186 would then find other purposes.

Services
The locomotives operate Intercity Direct services between Amsterdam, Rotterdam and Breda and The Hague, Rotterdam, Breda and Eindhoven. These use the High Speed Line (HSL-Zuid) and are operated by Nederlandse Spoorwegen.

Some of them are used on push-pull Benelux trains between Amsterdam, Antwerp and Brussels along with SNCB class 28. Since classes 28 and 186 are both Traxx MS 140 fitted with push-pull equipment, some Benelux trains run with a class 28 at one end and a class 186 at the other end.

Fleet

The NS Class 186 fleet comprises 45 yellow/blue locomotives leased from Akiem and 18 from Alpha Trains. Several more are leased without the yellow/blue scheme.

Livery
The Class 186 wears the Huisstijl blue and yellow livery. Since their sale to Akiem, they carry a small Akiem logo under the left windshield.

References

Sources
Bombardier Transportation bombardier.com
Railcolor - modern locomotive Power!  Website about post 1990s European mainline electric and diesel locomotives railcolor.net

External links

Drehstromloks.de - A comprehensive site about TRAXX and other Neubaulok series (German)
High quality gallery of TRAXX family @ Trainspo

TRAXX
Nederlandse Spoorwegen locomotives
Electric locomotives of the Netherlands
Standard gauge locomotives of the Netherlands
5 ft 6 in gauge locomotives
Railway locomotives introduced in 1996